Boište is a village in the outskirts of the town of Demir Hisar within the municipality of Demir Hisar Municipality, Republic of North Macedonia.

Demographics
In the early 20th century there were 720 inhabitants in Boište.
According to the 2002 census, the village had a total of 7 inhabitants. Ethnic groups in the village include:
Macedonians 7

References

External links

Villages in Demir Hisar Municipality